The Battle of Ghartiskari was fought either in October 1778 or 1779 in Ghartiskari between the personal guard of Ketevan Andronikashvili and a marauding Lezgin band. After three attacks mounted by the Georgians with Ketevan's personal leadership, the Lezgins were defeated decisively.

Background
Ketevan, a noblewoman on Heraclius II's court, was traveling from Mukhrani through Ghartiskari passage to the capital of the kingdom, Tbilisi accompanied by a royal guard detachment appointed by the king. At the time, frequent North-Caucasian incursions posed great threat to travelers in Georgia. After an ambush perpetrated by the Lezgins, Ketevan took charge of the guard and annihilated the marauders. After arriving in Tbilisi unharmed, she was received by Heraclius with a large celebration festivity.

References

18th century in Asia
Ghartiskari
Ghartiskari
Lezgins